Charles McQueen (17 April 1836 – 30 May 1906) was a New Zealand engineer and gold-dredger. He was born in Greenock, Renfrewshire, Scotland on 17 April 1836.

References

1836 births
1906 deaths
Scottish emigrants to New Zealand
19th-century New Zealand engineers
20th-century New Zealand engineers